West Coast MRT station is a future underground Mass Rapid Transit station on the Cross Island line (CRL) located in Clementi, Singapore. It will serve West Coast Road, West Coast Highway and West Coast Drive. First announced in September 2022, the station is expected to be completed in 2032 along with the other CRL Phase 2 stations.

History

West Coast station was first announced on 20 September 2022 by Transport Minister S Iswaran. The station will be constructed as part of Phase 2 of the Cross Island line (CRL), a  segment spanning six stations from Turf City station to Jurong Lake District station. The station is expected to be completed in 2032.

For the station's construction, two properties belonging to JTC at Pandan Loop Industrial Estate southwest of the station will be acquired for the construction of the station.

Details
West Coast station will serve the Cross Island line (CRL) and have an official station code of CR18. The station will be located at the site of Tanglin Secondary School, which was previously announced to merge with New Town Secondary School given falling enrolment and future development plans. Concerns were raised by residents that the station was not situated in the West Coast town centre. Transport Minister Iswaran clarified that the site was chosen for its proximity to residential estates and future industrial developments, which would allow the station to serve both areas.

References

Proposed railway stations in Singapore
Mass Rapid Transit (Singapore) stations
Railway stations scheduled to open in 2032